The Arkansas Attack are a professional American football team based in Little Rock, Arkansas. The team is a member of the Major League Football (MLFB), a public traded professional football league, and plays its home games at War Memorial Stadium.

The Attack are part of the league "Core Four" teams. They are the first pro football team in Little Rock, Arkansas since the Arkansas Diamonds, which played in the Continental Football League and later in the American Football Association.

History
On March 18, 2022, Major League Football launched a new website and revealed that there will be only four teams for the first season. On May 6, after some delays and many candidates, MLFB hired their fourth coach for 2022 season Earnest Wilson, which was most recently the head coach at Defiance College. The league would later reveled he will coach the Arkansas Attack.

The Attack started their training camp on July 21. One week later, the team was evicted from its hotel amid unpaid bills and reports of the league shutting down.

Staff

Players

References

American football teams in Arkansas
Sports in Little Rock, Arkansas